Carinerland is a municipality in the Rostock district, in Mecklenburg-Vorpommern, Germany. It was established in 2004. The former municipality Kirch Mulsow was merged into Carinerland in May 2019.

References 

Populated places established in 2004